Carmine Street Guitars is a Canadian documentary film, directed by Ron Mann and released in 2018. The film centres on Carmine Street Guitars, a long-running guitar store in New York City.

The film premiered on September 2, 2018, at the 75th Venice International Film Festival, and had its Canadian premiere at the 2018 Toronto International Film Festival on September 9. It went into general theatrical release in April 2019.

References

External links 
 
 

2018 films
Canadian documentary films
Documentary films about music and musicians
2018 documentary films
Films directed by Ron Mann
2010s Canadian films